Oren Zeitouni, (born February 18, 1976) is a former Israeli footballer. He most recently played for Maccabi Netanya in the Israeli Premier League, but has been forced to retire because of injury.

Playing career
He began in the youth system of Maccabi Tel Aviv but at age 15, he switched to Hapoel Tzafririm Holon. It was at the later where he made his first team debut in the 1993-94 season against Maccabi Petah Tikva.

Honours
 Israeli Premier League (2):
1998-99, 2002–03
Toto Cup (1):
2000-01
 Israel State Cup (1):
2005

References

External links

1976 births
Living people
Israeli Jews
Israeli footballers
Israel international footballers
Hapoel Tzafririm Holon F.C. players
Maccabi Tel Aviv F.C. players
Maccabi Netanya F.C. players
Hapoel Haifa F.C. players
Hapoel Nof HaGalil F.C. players
Liga Leumit players
Israeli Premier League players
Footballers from Holon
Israeli people of Libyan-Jewish descent
Association football midfielders